The following is an alphabetical list of members of the United States House of Representatives from the state of Vermont.  For chronological tables of members of both houses of the United States Congress from the state (through the present day), see United States congressional delegations from Vermont. The list of names should be complete, but other data may be incomplete.

Current representative 
 : Becca Balint (D) (since 2023)

List of members

See also

List of United States senators from Vermont
United States congressional delegations from Vermont
Vermont's congressional districts

References
House of Representatives List of Members

External links 
 Infoplease Biography A complete alphabetical list of all members of congress from Vermont

Vermont
 
Representatives